Marid is a type of powerful devil in Islamic traditions. The Arabic word meaning rebellious is applied to such supernatural beings.

In Arabic sources

Etymology 
The word mārid is an active participle of the root m-r-d (مرد), whose primary meaning is recalcitrant, rebellious. Lisān al-`arab, the encyclopedic dictionary of classical Arabic compiled by Ibn Manzur, reports only forms of this general meaning. It is found as an attribute of evil spirits in the Qur'an (aṣ-Ṣāffāt, 37:7), which speaks of a "safeguard against every rebellious devil" (شَيْطَانٍ مَارِدٍ, shaitān mārid). From the same Semitic root come the Hebrew words "Mered" (מרד "rebellion") and "Mored" (מורד "rebel").

The Wehr-Cowan dictionary of modern written Arabic also gives secondary meanings of demon and giant  (Persian:). Lane's Arabic-English Lexicon cites a source where it "is said to be applied to an evil jinnee of the most powerful class", but this distinction is not universal. For example, in the standard MacNaghten edition of One Thousand and One Nights one finds the words marid and ifrit used interchangeably (e.g., in The Story of the Fisherman).

Features 
Amira El Zein describes the marid as a creature who strives to predict the future by ascending to the heavens and spying on the angels. According to the Quran, the lower heavens are equipped with stars to protect against the rebellious devils (shaytan marid).

Ali Ibn Ibrahim Qomi recorded a narration attributed to Ali that, when God intended to create Adam he decided to punish human's predecessors. God obliterates the Nasnas, created a veil between jinn and humans, and made "the rebellious giants" (maradah) inhabiting the atmosphere.

A mārid is explicitly mentioned in Sirat Sayf ibn Dhi-Yazan. Accordingly, Sayf demands from the marid to lead him to Solomon's hoard. But following their nature, the demon does the exact opposite of that he was commanded. Later he learned from Khidr, he must command the opposite of that he desires him to do.

Both marids and ifrits are often considered as powerful devils. But the marid is the opposite of the cunning ifrit: While the ifrit is treacherous and deceitful, the marid is usually easily tricked by humans.

In modern fantasy genres

In Jonathan Stroud's Bartimaeus Sequence novel series, marids are the most powerful type of demons summoned by magicians.

In S. A. Chakraborty's Daevabad Trilogy, the marid are elemental creatures created from water. These creatures are said to be extremely powerful and had not been seen for centuries at the time of the first book in the series, The City of Brass.

In the Dungeons & Dragons tabletop game, marids are genies from the Elemental Plane of Water.

In the Fairyland stories by Catherynne M. Valente, marids are sea beings who eat rocks and salt and who have the power to grant wishes, but only to someone who can wrestle them to submission.

In Season 15, Episode 7 of the TV series Supernatural, the character Lee Webb keeps a marid trapped and fed in exchange for good fortune.

See also

References

Arabian legendary creatures
Demons in Islam
Devils
Giants in Islam
Jinn